Saksi Parish was a rural municipality of Estonia, in Lääne-Viru County. It had a population of 1196 (2003) and an area of 109,3 km².

Populated places
Saksi Parish had 14 villages.

References

Lääne-Viru County
Former municipalities of Estonia